Hildrizhausen is a town in the district of Böblingen in Baden-Württemberg in Germany.

Geography
The village is located on a clearing of the forest "Schönbuch" and about 9 kilometres south of Böblingen. In Hildrizhausen there is one of the two sources of the river "Würm".

History
Hildrizhausen was most likely founded in the 8th century.

Literature
Hildrizhausen features in a novel "The Schoenbuch Forest" by Robert John Goddard published in paperback by Bright Pen (2006) and available as an e-book.

References

Böblingen (district)